Balázs József Tóth (born 24 September 1981) is a retired Hungarian football midfielder. He is a Hungarian international.

Career
Tóth signed a three-year contract with the Genk who upset the form book by finishing second in the Belgian First Division in 2005–06. Tóth started his career at Videoton before moving to Turkey with Malatyaspor midway through the 2004–05 season. He spent the 2005–06 season on loan at Kayseri Erciyesspor.

International career
He made his senior international debut against Latvia on 19 February 2004. He gained 34 caps and played his last international game for Hungary in the Wembley Stadium against England on 11 August 2010.

Career statistics

Club

Notes

References

External links

1981 births
Living people
Association football midfielders
Hungarian footballers
Hungary international footballers
Fehérvár FC players
Malatyaspor footballers
Kayseri Erciyesspor footballers
K.R.C. Genk players
VVV-Venlo players
Puskás Akadémia FC players
Süper Lig players
Belgian Pro League players
Eredivisie players
Nemzeti Bajnokság I players
Hungarian expatriate footballers
Expatriate footballers in Belgium
Expatriate footballers in Turkey
Expatriate footballers in the Netherlands
Hungarian expatriate sportspeople in Belgium
Hungarian expatriate sportspeople in Turkey
Hungarian expatriate sportspeople in the Netherlands
People from Ózd
Sportspeople from Borsod-Abaúj-Zemplén County